The Americas Zone is one of three zones of regional competition in the 2022 Billie Jean King Cup.

Group I 
 Venue: Salinas Golf and Tennis Club, Salinas, Ecuador (hard)
 Date: 13–16 April 2022

The eight teams were divided into two pools of four teams. The four nations finishing 1st and 2nd in their pools took part in play-offs to determine the nations advancing to the 2022 Billie Jean King Cup play-offs. The nations finishing third and last took part in a relegation play-offs, with the losing nations relegated to Group II for 2023.

Seeding

 1Billie Jean King Cup Rankings as of 8 November 2021

Pools

Play-offs

Final placements 

Group II 
 Venue: Centro Nacional de Tenis Parque del Este, Santo Domingo, Dominican Republic (hard)
 Dates: 25–30 July 2022

The seventeen teams were divided into three pools of four teams and one pool of five teams. The four nations finishing 1st in their pools took part in play-offs to determine the two nations promoted to Group I in 2023.

Seeding

 1Billie Jean King Cup Rankings as of 19 April 2022

Pools

Play-offs

Final placements 

References 

 Billie Jean King Cup Result, 2022 Americas Group I
 Billie Jean King Cup Result, 2022 Americas Group II

External links 
 Billie Jean King Cup website

Americas
 
Tennis tournaments in Ecuador
Billie Jean King Cup Americas Zone